Animals First was a New Zealand political party dedicated to animal rights and animal welfare. In the 1996 elections, it won 0.17% of the vote, putting it in twelfth place. In the 1999 elections, it declined slightly, winning 0.16% of the vote (fourteenth place). The party was deregistered at its own request in 2000.

See also 
 Animal welfare in New Zealand

References 

Defunct political parties in New Zealand
Animal advocacy parties
Animal rights organizations
Political parties with year of establishment missing
Political parties with year of disestablishment missing
Animal welfare organisations based in New Zealand
2000 disestablishments in New Zealand
Political parties disestablished in 2000
Single-issue political parties in New Zealand